COMBIS is a regional high-tech ICT company in Croatia.
The company operates as an independent company wholly owned by Hrvatski Telekom, with headquarters in Zagreb.

History

Founded in 1990 in Dubrovnik, in 2010 COMBIS became a member of T-HT Group, Deutsche Telekom Group, which created a wide range of integrated IT-telecommunications business solutions and services on the market of Croatia. From a small company, COMBIS has developed into a regional company, with daughter companies in Bosnia and Herzegovina and Serbia.

In 2014 Combis was the largest IT company in Croatia by revenue excluding distributors and retailers.

IT solutions and services

30SEC is Combis' Security Operations Center (SOC) created as an answer to increased exposure of information systems to everyday sophisticated threats and attacks. The risk of being hacked is greater than ever. Combis' team of experts covers a wide spectre of solutions for information and cyber security (vendor independent security).

Combis Cloud No.9 is a complete solution that offers the user a chance to move its business partly (Hybrid Cloud) or fully (Full Cloud) to “cloud”. That means that there is no need for the user to worry about racks size in his data centre, power of servers cooling devices, network switches or security patches.

ComProtect is a lower cost alternative to physical replication of databases in standby Oracle Data Guard. Easy implementation, surveillance and maintenance with minimal data loss and high availability/redundance.

Combis ARA enables 100% automated remote control. It enables simple handling of remote control requests and completely automated configuration on remote control infrastructure.

Partnerships
Combis has long term partnerships with many world leading corporations such as IBM, Cisco, Microsoft, Dell, Oracle, Hewlett Packard, Broadsoft, VMware, Veeam, Lenovo, Lexmark, Palo Alto Networks, Red Hat, Fortinet, Fireeye, Trend Micro, Sophos, Unify,…

Awards
Microsoft Partner of the Year 2022 for Croatia, Regional VMware Partner of The Year Award, Cisco Services Partner of the Year, Cisco Collaboration Partner of the Year, Oracle Specialization Award for Virtualized Core Network Systems, Palo Alto NextWave Platinum Innovator.

Competences
ISACA, SANS, OFFENSIVE SECURITY, COMPTIA ADVANCED, (ISC)2

Locations
Combis has eight service locations in Croatia, in Zagreb, Split, Rijeka, Zadar, Varaždin and Dubrovnik. It is present in Bosnia and Hercegovina, with headquarters in Sarajevo, and three service locations, in Banja Luka, Tuzla and Mostar, and in Serbia, with headquarters in Beograd. 
Belgrade.

References

External links
 

Companies based in Zagreb
Technology companies established in 1990
Information technology companies of Croatia
Croatian companies established in 1990